Syed Zameer Ali Amjad Rizvi (born 5 February 1981) also known by his stage name Zameer, is a Canadian singer-songwriter. His song about social injustice against athletes with disabilities, "Win or Defeat", was licensed as a theme song by the 2010 Paralympic Games. Rizvi went on to perform the song at the 2010 Olympic Games. Rizvi garnered further success with strong sales of his debut album From Under the Bleachers from which the single "Glory of Love" rose to the 73rd spot on the Billboard Hot 100 charts. Several songs on From Under the Bleachers touched on controversial subject matter which created a social media storm and helped him climb to the top of Billboard's social media charts at No. 1 in 2012.

Life and career

Early life and career beginnings
Rizvi was born in Lahore, Pakistan. He was raised in Libya, Saudi Arabia, Pakistan, England and finally Canada. In 1995, Rizvi and his family immigrated to Canada, and currently reside in Mississauga, Ontario. Rizvi is the youngest of four siblings, who later formed their own band. In 1998, Rizvi and his two brothers, Ali and Hussain, released their first EP as the band Dead Shyre. Although it received moderate success, Rizvi credits Dead Shyre for teaching him the basics of recording and production. They also have one sister, Tara. Both of Rizvi's parents are university professors. Rizvi holds a bachelor's degree in electrical engineering from the University of Western Ontario. Zameer has travelled quite a lot which is reelected in his music.

2002–2004: Auditory scene analysis research
During 2002–2004, while attending the University of Western Ontario in London, Ontario, Rizvi studied the mathematical ingredients of some of this era's hit music, using auditory scene analysis. His research paper, titled "Auditory Scene Analysis of 20th Century Popular Music", was published by the Department of Electrical and Computer Engineering at the University of Western Ontario.

2005–2007: "Win or Defeat"
In 2005, Rizvi moved back to Toronto to pursue his music career. He formed a band and performed at local Toronto open mics and bars, including Lee's Palace and the Horseshoe Tavern. Over the next two years, Rizvi steadily moved up Toronto's live music food chain, performing at bigger and better venues including the Opera House, Hershey Centre, and ultimately the Skydome (Rogers Centre).

It was around this time that Rizvi wrote and released his debut single "Win or Defeat", and was nominated as 'Best Artist' at the Toronto Independent Music Awards. He was also ranked amongst the top 10 live acts in Toronto by the world's largest music festival, Emergenza. Record labels and producers started paying attention, and Rizvi was approached by multiple Grammy Award winning producer, Steve Thompson. Steve later went on to re-produce "Win or Defeat", which Rizvi debuted for 30,000 spectators during a sporting event at the Skydome in Toronto.

2008–2010: Partnering with the 2010 Vancouver Games
The message of "Win or Defeat" is to overcome all obstacles to pursue a dream, which resonated with the Canadian Paralympic Committee. The Committee subsequently licensed "Win or Defeat" to use as a song promoting athletes with disabilities. The Paralympics produced the video for "Win or Defeat", which featured Canadian Paralympic gold medalists Brad Bowden and Paul Rosen. Soon after the video's release, "Win or Defeat" was in rotation on MTV, MuchMusic and over 45 radio stations nationwide. Rizvi went on to perform the song at the 2010 Vancouver Games in Whistler, British Columbia.

2010–2012: From Under the Bleachers and "Tatti"
Rizvi released his debut album titled From Under the Bleachers in 2011. According to Rizvi, the title of the album originated from his experiences while sitting under the water tank on his roof in Pakistan. Production credits for From Under the Bleachers include five-time Grammy Award-winning producer Steve Thompson. Rizvi toured Norway, Pakistan, Canada and USA to promote his debut release.

The album was well received, with strong digital sales, leading to Rizvi's single "Glory of Love" climbing to No. 73 on the Billboard Hot 100 charts in Canada. The album also snagged Rizvi the title of "Hot Shot Debut" and No. 5 on the Billboard Emerging Artists chart.

In March 2011, Rizvi released a music video for his song "Mind Over Murder" which questions Islam's promise of 70 virgins in paradise. In the video, Rizvi plays a terrorist who winds up in paradise with 70 virgins as promised by the religion. The conclusion of the video shows the virgins turning into vampires, and the terrorist changing his mind about killing innocent people. Rizvi received several threats by those who felt he was targeting the Islamic faith.

In April 2012, Rizvi released another controversial satirical song and music video called "Tatti". In Punjabi (the predominant language in northern India and Pakistan), "Tatti"" means to defecate. The comedic video was featured on the website of Late Show with David Letterman. In the video, Rizvi shines light on the subjugation of women in Indian culture, which led to outrage in the Indian community. Rizvi received public death threats and insults, despite which, he did not remove the video from circulation.

2014: Collaboration with Noori
In October 2014 Rizvi announced that he is collaborating with the Pakistani rock pioneers Noori to release a new single on his upcoming album. The song was produced by 13-time Juno award winner Gavin Brown and is available to purchase worldwide. Brown is credited with combining Rizvi's soulful love song lyrics and hard rock elements from noori. Rizvi and guitarist Ali Noor are cousins and grew up together in Lahore, Pakistan before Rizvi moved to Canada.

2015–2016: Her
Rizvi announced plans to release a new album called "Her" during a 19 January interview on Open Chest TV with Raj Girn, part of the Anokhi Magazine network. Rizvi revealed he has been working with drummer Johnny Fay of The Tragically Hip and 13-time Juno winning producer Gavin Brown (musician). Rizvi's first single "Crazy" ft. Mia Martina came out on 28 April. It debuted at No. 5 breakout on the Billboard Hot Dance Club charts on 18 July 2015. It spent 6 weeks in the top 50, peaking at No. 42. On 30 June 2016 Zameer released the album Her while on tour with Ali Noor as his guest guitarist.

2017: Digital Summer 
Zameer started off 2016 with the release of the song and music video "Oh Yea!". In July 2016 Zameer went on tour to promote his album Her. During the course of the tour Zameer live streamed several sessions of him and Ali Noor working on new music. In early 2017 Zameer teased a song and music video entitled "Walk Away" which was later revealed to be the song they worked on while on tour in 2016. After teasing "Walk Away" several music videos released which included "Endless Summer" and "Uh Oh". On 28 July 2017 Zameer released the album Digital Summer which featured "Walk Away", all the songs from the recent music videos, and B-sides and EDM remixes from the Her recording sessions. In November 2017 Zameer released the music video for "Walk Away".

2018: Nomad 
On 30 November 2018 Zameer released his 4th studio album Nomad which featured the singles "Hope", "Don't Stop Movin (feat. Lily Kincade)", and "Origin (feat. Holly Pyle)", along with 8 more previously unreleased tracks. One of the new songs "Who's to Say" was previewed previously during live acoustic performances and live streams on social media, but wasn't produced and mastered until its debut on Nomad. This album was fully produced and orchestrated by Zameer Rizvi. While most of the album is carried by Zameer's vocals and guitar performances, he also tapped several other instrumentalists including string musicians from the LA philharmonic and a trumpeter who has played on multiple Grammy winning and Billboard No. 1 albums.

Discography

Albums
 From Under the Bleachers (2010)
 Her (2016)
 Digital Summer (2017)
 Nomad (2018)

Chart positions

Music videos
Rizvi has released fourteen music videos to date:

Other work
In 2006, Rizvi founded his own imprint called Rizvi Records through which he releases his music. He also founded ZRG, a provider of communications and technology consulting services to a client roster which includes Bell Canada and Research in Motion.

Rizvi is a multi-instrumentalist and plays the guitars, drums, and keyboards on most of the songs on From Under the Bleachers.

Charity work
Rizvi has founded several charitable initiatives for various causes. In 2007, Rizvi partnered with MuchMoreMusic to spearhead Sing For South Asia, a charity concert to raise funds for victims of the 2005 Kashmir earthquake. In 2008, Rizvi decided to donate partial profit from the sales of his song "Win or Defeat" to the Canadian Paralympic Foundation, an organization dedicated to enriching the lives of Canadians with disabilities through sport. Between 2009 and 2010, Rizvi participated in a series of performances for Hands Up Canada, a charitable initiative to support Paralympic Sports across 30 shopping malls in Canada.

Collaborations and awards
 Rizvi came into Fatlabs Studios to work with Canadian producer Vikas Kohli on a number of tracks for his debut album From Under the Bleachers, such as "Mind over Murder", "Final Conversation" and "Win or Defeat".
 Rizvi was the recipient of the 2008 Anokhi Sexy and Successful Music Award for Most Promising Musical Artist. Other winners and attendees included Slumdog Millionaires Freida Pinto. Rizvi also performed at the Gala.

References

External links
 Official website

1981 births
Living people
Musicians from Lahore
Canadian musicians of Pakistani descent
Musicians from Mississauga
University of Western Ontario alumni
21st-century Canadian male singers